

The maroon-bellied parakeet (Pyrrhura frontalis) is a small parrot found from southeastern Brazil to north-eastern Argentina, including eastern Paraguay and Uruguay. It is also known as the reddish-bellied parakeet, and in aviculture it is usually referred to as the maroon-bellied conure, reddish-bellied conure or brown-eared conure.

Taxonomy
It has been suggested that the reddish-bellied parakeet should include the blaze-winged parakeet (P. devillei) as a subspecies based on intermediate specimens from Paraguay. But such hybrids are not common in the wild and the two populations generally maintain their integrity; recent sources are undecided on whether to treat them as one species or two.

Description
These birds range from 25 to 28 cm (10–11 in), and are primarily green, with a maroon patch on the belly, a "scaly" yellow-green-barred breast and sides of neck, a whitish ear-patch often tinged brown, and a maroon undertail. The specific name frontalis is a reference to its dark maroon frontlet – a feature which separates it from most similar species. The primaries are blue on the outer webs, green on the inner webs, and dark on the tips. The beak is black.

There are two subspecies, with extensive intergradation where their ranges contact:
 Maroon-bellied parakeet proper, Pyrrhura frontalis frontalis – Brazil from south Bahia to Rio Grande do Sul, and west to Mato Grosso do Sul.
Uppertail greenish-yellow grading into a broad reddish tip.
 Azara's conure, Pyrrhura frontalis chiripepe – Eastern Paraguay, Argentina, Uruguay, and far southern Brazil.
Uppertail entirely greenish-yellow.

Another subspecies, kriegi, was described from Bahia in 1932, but today it is universally considered a junior synonym of the nominate subspecies. Distinguished by a narrow brownish-red tip to the tail, it constitutes just a morph or an intermediate genotype making up just 20% of the specimens even in the supposed range. The name Krieg's conure is occasionally used in aviculture for such birds, and some breed them exclusively; they are of course perfectly interfertile with individuals of the normal morph however.

Ecology

The maroon-bellied parakeet is common in woodland, and forest edges. In the northern part of its range, it mainly lives in highlands up to 1,400 m (4,600 ft), but elsewhere it is primarily found in lowlands up to 1,000 m (3,300 ft). Tolerates disturbance well and even lives in urban parks (e.g., Rio de Janeiro and São Paulo) and feeds in gardens. Flock size is usually only 6–12 individuals, but up to 40. As other members of the genus Pyrrhura, it primarily feeds on fruits, flowers, and similar plant matter; they rarely participate in mixed-species feeding flock.

It is generally common and not considered threatened by the IUCN. Though there is little trade in these parrots, captive-bred birds are occasionally available as pets. Maroon-bellied parakeets can learn to talk, although not clearly. They are among the quietest conures, but their shrill voices still irritate some people.

References

 Juniper, Tony & Parr, Mike (1998): Parrots: A Guide to Parrots of the World. Christopher Helm, London. 
 Lowell, Michele (1994): Your Pet Bird: A Buyer's Guide. 
 Machado, C.G. (1999): A composição dos bandos mistos de aves na Mata Atlântica da Serra de Paranapiacaba, no sudeste brasileiro [Mixed flocks of birds in Atlantic Rain Forest in Serra de Paranapiacaba, southeastern Brazil]. Revista Brasileira de Biologia 59(1): 75–85 [Portuguese with English abstract].  PDF fulltext

External links

World Parrot Trust Parrot Encyclopedia – Species Profiles

Pyrrhura
Birds of South America
Birds of Brazil
Birds of Paraguay
Birds of Uruguay
Birds of Argentina
Birds described in 1818
Taxa named by Louis Jean Pierre Vieillot